George S. Moore (1884 – after 1908) was an English professional footballer who played in the Football League for Birmingham. He played as an inside forward.

Moore was born in Coventry, Warwickshire. He played for Nuneaton Borough before joining Birmingham of the First Division in 1908. He made his debut in the last game of the 1907–08 season, with the team already relegated, in a 4–0 defeat at home to Bristol City. He played twice more in the next season before returning to local football with Leamington Town in 1909.

References

1884 births
Year of death missing
Footballers from Coventry
English footballers
Association football forwards
Nuneaton Borough F.C. players
Birmingham City F.C. players
Leamington F.C. players
English Football League players
Date of birth missing
Place of death missing